ELABELA (ELA, Apela, Toddler) is a hormonal peptide that in humans is encoded by the APELA gene. Elabela is one of two endogenous ligands for the G-protein-coupled APLNR receptor.

Ela is secreted by certain cell types including human embryonic stem cells. It is widely expressed in various developing organs such as the blastocyst, placenta, heart, kidney,  endothelium, and is circulating in human plasma.

Discovery 
Elabela is a micropeptide that was identified in 2013 by Professor Bruno Reversade's team.

Biosynthesis 
Elabela gene encodes a pre-proprotein of 54 amino acids, with a signal peptide in the N-terminal region. After translocation into the endoplasmic reticulum and cleavage of the signal peptide, the proprotein of 32 amino acids may generate several active fragments.

Physiological functions 
The sites of APLNR receptor expression are linked to the different functions played by Elabela in the organism. Despite that, Elabela is capable of signaling independently of APLNR in human embryonic stem cells and certain cancer cell lines including OVISE.

Embryonic pluripotency 
The Elabela protein is synthesized, processed and secreted by undifferentiated human embryonic stem cells  but not mouse embryonic stem cells. In humans it is under the direct regulation of POU5F1 (a.k.a. OCT4) and NANOG.

Through autocrine and paracrine signalling, endogenous Elabela entrains the PI3K/AKT/mTOR pathway to maintain pluripotency and self-renewal.

Vascular 
Elabela is expressed by midline tissues (such as the notochord in zebrafish and neural tube in mammals) during organogenesis.

There it serves as a chemoattractant to angioblasts expressing APLNR at their cell surface. This participates in the formation of the first and secondary vessels of the vascular system.

Cardiac 
The ELABELA -APLNR signaling axis is required for formation of the coronary vessels of the heart in mice through the sinus venosus progenitors.

Pre-eclampsia 

ELA is a secreted into the bloodstream by the developing placenta. Pregnant mice lacking Ela, exhibit pre-eclampsia-like symptoms, characterized by proteinuria and gestational hypertension.

Infusion of exogenous ELA normalizes blood pressure and prevents intrauterine growth retardation in pups born to Ela knockout mothers. ELA increases the invasiveness of trophoblast-like cells, suggesting that it may enhance placental development to prevent eclampsia.

Therapeutics 
Several mimetics of ELA have been developed for therapeutic purposes. Amgen has created a camel antibody and a small molecule agonist capable of mimicking the function of ELA  towards it cognate receptor APLNR.

The latter has entered phase 1 clinical trials for heart failure and acute kidney disease. Bristol Myers Squibb has also created its own small molecule agonist of APLNR.

An opinion published in the Lancet in 2019 suggested that ELABELA could be used to treat  intrauterine growth restriction and maternal morbidity linked to eclampsia.

References 

Genes
Peptides
Ligands
Hormones